The posterior atlantoaxial ligament is a broad, thin membrane attached, above, to the lower border of the posterior arch of the atlas; below, to the upper edges of the laminæ of the axis.

It supplies the place of the ligamenta flava, and is in relation, behind, with the Obliqui capitis inferiores.

See also
 Atlanto-axial joint

References

External links
 Description at spineuniverse.com

Ligaments of the head and neck
Bones of the vertebral column